Meskel is a Christian holiday in the Ethiopian Orthodox and Eritrean Orthodox churches that commemorates the discovery of the True Cross by the Roman Empress Helena (Saint Helena) in the fourth century. Meskel occurs on the 17 Meskerem in the Ethiopian calendar (27 September, Gregorian calendar, or on 28 September in leap years). "Meskel" (or "Meskal" or "Mesqel", there are various ways to transliterate from Ge'ez to Latin script) is Ge'ez for "cross".

The festival is known as Feast of the Exaltation of the Holy Cross in other Orthodox, Catholic or Protestant churches. The churches that follow the Gregorian calendar celebrate the feast yearly on 14 September.

The feast is held in Meskel Square, named after the festival, in the capital city of Addis Ababa. Religious and civil leaders preside over the celebration, and public figures give speeches and reference biblical themes and stories. Many Ethiopians who live in cities return to their villages to celebrate the national event. When it gets darker, the Demera is burned. UNESCO inscribed Meskel in 2013 on the Representative List of the Intangible Cultural Heritage of Humanity.

Overview  
The Meskel celebration includes the burning of a large bonfire, or Demera, based on the belief that Queen Eleni, as she is known, had a revelation in a dream. She was told that she should make a bonfire and that the smoke would show her where the True Cross was buried. So she ordered the people of Jerusalem to bring wood and make a huge pile. After adding frankincense to it the bonfire was lit and the smoke rose high up to the sky and returned to the ground, exactly to the spot where the Cross had been buried. 

According to local traditions, this Demera-procession takes place in the early evening the day before Meskel or on the day itself.  The firewood is decorated with daisies prior to the celebration. Charcoal from the remains of the fire is afterwards collected and used by the faithful to mark their foreheads with the shape of a cross (compare Ash Wednesday). Edward Ullendorff records a number of beliefs of the meaning of Demera, with some believing that it "marks the ultimate act in the cancellation of sins, while others hold that the direction of the smoke and the final collapse of the heap indicate the course of future events – just as the cloud of smoke the Lord raised over the Tabernacle offered guidance to the children of Israel (Exod. 40:34–38)."

One explanation for the high rank this festival has in the church calendar is that it is believed that a part of the true Cross has been brought to Ethiopia from Egypt. It is said to be kept at Amba Geshen, which itself has a cross-shaped plan.

According to the Ethiopian  Orthodox Church, the discovery of the True Cross is traditionally believed to have been in March, but Meskel was moved to September to avoid holding a festival during Lent, and because the church commemorating the True Cross in Jerusalem was dedicated during September. Ullendorff speculates that Meskel replaced an older festival, with pagan and Hebraic associations, which he believes received its Christian sanction around the reign of Emperor Amda Seyon in the fourteenth century. "The most ancient meaning of these feasts – as was also the case in Israel – was no doubt seasonal: the month of Maskaram marked the end of the rains, the resumption of work, and the reopening of communications."

Notes

References
 Ullendorff, Edward (1968) Ethiopia and the Bible,  Schweich lectures series, Oxford University Press for the British Academy,

External links

Festival and Holidays on the website of the Embassy of the Federal Democratic Republic of Ethiopia in the United Kingdom, with a section on "Meskel – The Finding of the True Cross"

Ethiopian Orthodox Tewahedo Church
Eritrean Orthodox Tewahedo Church
Christian festivals and holy days
Christian festivals
September observances
Intangible Cultural Heritage of Humanity
Helena, mother of Constantine I